The alphabet agencies, or  New Deal agencies, were the U.S. federal government agencies created as part of the New Deal of President Franklin D. Roosevelt. The earliest agencies were created to combat the Great Depression in the United States and were established during Roosevelt's first 100 days in office in 1933. In total, at least 69 offices were created during Roosevelt's terms of office as part of the New Deal. Some alphabet agencies were established by Congress, such as the Tennessee Valley Authority. Others were established through Roosevelt executive orders, such as the Works Progress Administration and the Office of Censorship, or were part of larger programs such as the many that belonged to the Works Progress Administration. Some of the agencies still exist today, while others have merged with other departments and agencies or were abolished.

The agencies were sometimes referred to as alphabet soup. Libertarian author William Safire notes that the phrase "gave color to the charge of excessive bureaucracy." Democrat Al Smith, who turned against Roosevelt, said his government was “submerged in a bowl of alphabet soup."  "Even the Comptroller-General of the United States, who audits the government's accounts, declared he had never heard of some of them." While previously all monetary appropriations had been separately passed by Act of Congress, as part of their power of the purse; the National Industrial Recovery Act allowed Roosevelt to allocate $3.3 billion without Congress (as much as had been previously spent by government in ten years time), through executive orders and other means. These powers were used to create many of the alphabet agencies. Other laws were passed allowing the new bureaus to pass their own directives within a wide sphere of authority. Even though the National Industrial Recovery Act was found to be unconstitutional, many of the agencies created under it remained.

Partial list of alphabet agencies
Agencies  created between 1933 and 1938 are New Deal Agencies.

In national security
Since the 1990s, the term "alphabet agencies" has been commonly used to describe the agencies of the U.S. national security state. Many are members of the United States Intelligence Community, and several were founded or expanded in the aftermath of the September 11 attacks. Alphabet agencies in this sense of the term may also be called three-letter agencies, because they often use three-letter acronyms.

Cabinet departments
Partial list

Notes

 
Federal assistance in the United States
1930s in the United States